Todd Cochran (born September 3, 1951) is an American pianist, composer, keyboardist, essayist and conceptual artist. Early in his career he was also professionally known as Bayeté. Cochran started his career as a teenager with saxophonist John Handy. Two years later he joined vibraphonist Bobby Hutcherson’s Quartet, and made his jazz recording debut composing and performing on a benchmark album for Hutcherson, "Head On" (on Blue Note Records) that featured a nineteen-piece ensemble. The recording was critically hailed as cross-pollinating the evolving contemporary modal jazz, avant-garde sound of the 1970s. Cochran’s first solo project "Worlds Around the Sun" became a #1 jazz album and marked his entree into the jazz discussion. From the mid 1970s forward Todd has experimented with and incorporated synthesizers, electronic and mixed-media concepts in his creative projects while collaborating with a wide range of artists in the genres of jazz, art rock, pop, R&B, and twenty-first-century classical.

Cochran's best-known jazz compositions include "At The Source" (Bobby Hutcherson), "Free Angela" (Bayeté Todd Cochran, Santana), "Eternal Worlds" Julian Priester, "My Pearl", "Geni-Geni" (Automatic Man), "Monte Carlo Nights" Grover Washington Jr., "Spanish Rose", "Back To Lovin' Again" (Freddie Hubbard), and "Secret Places" (Todd Cochran). 

He released two albums on Prestige Records in 1972 and 1973. He was keyboardist and lead singer of Automatic Man from 1976 - 1978.  He was also a member of Fuse One, a coalition of jazz musicians who released two albums on CTI Records in 1980 and 1981.

Youth 
Pianist, composer Todd Cochran was born in San Francisco and raised in a home environment of classical music and jazz, and an atmosphere of deep love for the arts. While his parents had professional livelihoods – his father, in the automobile industry and his mother, an accountant – both were trained musicians. His father, a singer and pianist, and mother, a violinist. As a child, there never was a time when music or conversations about art or culture was not occurring in the household. Gaining a natural sense of the importance of the arts came with this childhood exposure. Along with the early passion Todd exhibited for the piano he benefitted from his family's devoted love of attending live music and art performances that extended across the spectrum: chamber music, jazz, dance, plays and religious concerts. With his father he enjoyed going to sports, however listening to recordings, watching documentary films, and reading were at the heart of his youth and teenage years. 

Todd grew up the Lakeview district of San Francisco, a largely Black but racially mixed neighborhood and community. Influential throughout Todd’s childhood was his maternal grandmother, an ordained minister, evangelist and protofeminist. San Francisco during the 60s and 70s was a vital center of the cultural revolution. The energy of the civil rights movement was inescapable. Within the agitation and protest was a profound sense of hope; that equal justice, change and social transformation could happen. Todd’s musical training began with private study at age 5, and by age 9 he was enrolled in the Trinity College of Music, London (TCL) diploma program. Hence his fundamental orientation to the piano and performing arts was classical music and theory. At around age 14 he was exposed to jazz. He was transfixed by the music and the notion of playing it captivated his imagination. As an aspiring young musician, playing jazz – learning its story, and becoming knowledgeable about the inflections of the blues experience was his rite de passage. “I was hearing the music, reading the poetry, absorbing the songs and words that were being written, seeing the images, experiencing changing attitudes, understanding the narratives; my heart and thoughts were inspired by the passion of the messages and the possibilities. I knew without any doubt I had to become a part of that zeitgeist.” To that end, making art that creatively mirrored the vitality and passions of the socio-cultural moment set the path of his musical career. By his mid-teens Todd had become consumed by music. While continuing to study classical music and theory, learning to play jazz and the communal experience of making creative music and improvisation captivated him.

Early Years 
Todd’s musical development was impacted by the cultural, political and community atmosphere of the civil rights movement. Shifting attitudes made for a mélange of possibilities and directions to pursue. Following his curiosities, he circulated widely.  At 17, during the highpoint of psychedelic San Francisco, Cochran’s joining saxophonist John Handy’s band solidified his commitment to jazz. John Handy who’d come to fame as a member of Charles Mingus’ band also collaborated with Indian classical masters Ali Akbar Khan and Zakir Hussain. A jazz master and also knowledgeable about non-Western and European classical disciplines, Handy was a strict bandleader who demanded deft attention to the nuances of sound and expression. This had an immense effect on Todd. 

Soon thereafter he began his mentor relationship and enduring friendship with New Zealand jazz pianist Mike Nock – well-known for his work with wind multi-instrumentalist, composer Yusef Lateef. It was after filling in at the keyboards of Nock’s band The Fourth Way in a performance at Bill Graham’s Fillmore West (San Francisco) that he began to attract the attention of the serious jazz community. A key musical connection with renowned vibraphonist Bobby Hutcherson ensued. Several years of playing in Hutcherson’s quartet led to Todd’s auspicious entrée into the world of recording, with Todd composing, arranging and playing on Hutcherson’s album “Head On” for Blue Note Records. Todd was also a member of Hutcherson’s co-led quintet with trumpeter Woody Shaw. 

Todd’s work with Bobby Hutcherson led to meeting Duke Pearson (pianist, arranger, producer) who encouraged his interest in recording. From there he composed four pieces and played keyboards on the album “Iapetus” with saxophonist Hadley Caliman. Later came the live album “Intensity” with saxophonist John Klemmer.

Throughout Cochran’s chrysalis period of establishing a place in the music community as a pianist and growing into his self-definition as an artist in his own right, Todd’s feelings about humanity, identity, inclusion, and advocating for the cessation of injustices throughout the world deepened. Taking root was the connection between the passion of the sociocultural and creative arts movement, and his personal reality. Aware that insightful voices often go overlooked, he aspired to do his part to bring constructive narratives into the conversation.

aka Bayeté Todd Cochran 
An evolving sense of what Cochran then wanted to do musically precipitated a more conscious and focused creative impulse and changing his name to “Bayeté.” (Pronounced: by-yet-tāy)

“I felt like something lost or hidden needed to be discovered within – my awareness and thinking – something purer than an imagined state of mind. The urge was wanting to learn, to go deeper – and wanting to know by awakening my sensitivities to a larger context. Changing my name was an important choice, and I wrote a composition titled "Bayeté” on my album Worlds Around The Sun that expresses this in part, without words.”

Worlds Around The Sun 
Cochran’s first solo album Worlds Around the Sun featured his composition “Free Angela” – written as an homage to Angela Davis, that was later recorded by Santana. It has been widely sampled by hip-hop artists. Cochran’s “Free Angela” along with the Rolling Stone’s “Sweet Black Angel” and John Lennon and Yoko Ono’s “Angela” is discussed in the book “Listen Whitey” by author, culture historian, and music reissue producer Pat Thomas. Worlds Around The Sun was reissued on the Omnivore label. (2014). Cochran also penned the score to the documentary film about Angela Davis titled “Ain’t It Slick” by Independent filmmaker/director Francisco Newman. A second, more experimental, and transitional solo album for Prestige, Seeking Other Beauty followed. 

Also, elaborating on the zeitgeist of the period was his composition “Eternal Worlds” that Todd (aka Bayeté) wrote and was the pianist for trombonist Julian Priester’s album  Love, Love (ECM). Haunting and critically lauded, “Eternal Worlds” is an immersive feast of melody and textures. Providing an intertwined rhythmic component are two drummers; Leon “Ndugu” Chancler (Miles Davis) and Eric Gravatt (Weather Report.) “Love, Love” has been digitally remastered and reissued on UMG.

Automatic Man and Art Rock 
For Cochran, pursuing the life of a jazz purist proved easier said than done. This was particularly so in the rich climate of the Bay Area when ignoring boundaries and melding traditions was leading to indispensable breakthroughs in music. A mood of discovery permeated the creative ecosystem with an overpowering sense of optimism about music making a difference in the world.

It was a time of uninhibited exploration. Todd ventured into the avant-garde and a period of performing completely free music; extemporaneous, extended improvisations. But his explorations in the mode of chance unlocked pathways to a compositional simplicity that he enlarged with the imagery of words. Piano keys gave way to electric keyboards and synthetic sounds. Songs based on mood spaces, mindscapes and aural paintings communicated an inner complexity.  

Todd ventured a path of collaboration, fulfilling multiple roles as the concept demanded. Projects varied with different challenges, the range of which would contribute to the emergence of his matured voice. He combined real-life and myth with science fiction to make statements of futurism. His musical approach as a conceptual artist was on full display in his collaboration with Michael Shrieve (drummer and Santana band member) and the formation of the band Automatic Man. Todd (Bayeté) and Michael, along with guitarist, Pat Thrall and bassist, Doni Harvey produced a chemistry of genre-bending art rock. Reflecting an enduring relevance, decades later the music of Automatic Man has a sizeable underground rock following.Recording and launching the project in London made way for Todd to circulate in the progressive and experimental rock scene. The psychology of the moment was aspirational and inspirational — and musicians were seeking fresh audience engaging styles of music. Recordings Todd made in England include Jim Capaldi (Traffic), Bill Bruford (Yes), Phil Collins’ fusion band, Brand X, and The Real Thing. In Los Angeles, Todd recorded the second Automatic Man album titled “Visitors.” The personnel of this recording changed with two key band-member replacements. Joining Todd and guitarist Pat Thrall in the new lineup was bassist Jerome Rimson (former Van Morrison musical director), and drummer, Glenn Symmonds. Todd would later return to England to join Peter Gabriel’s band; touring, and additionally recording on the Robert Fripp produced “Peter Gabriel 2: Scratch” album. His concluding period in London was as a member of “PM” – a band with Emerson, Lake and Palmer drummer, Carl Palmer.

Filmography 

*Additional Music/Arranging/Performing 

(1) "The Spook Who Sat Behind The Door" in 2012 named to the National Film Registry as a work of enduring importance to American culture. Sept. 18, 2020 New York Film Festival

Discography (selected)

As solo artist
1972: Worlds Around the Sun (Prestige) 2014: Reissue (Omnivore)
1973: Seeking Other Beauty (Prestige)
1991: TODD (Vital)
1997: Secret Places (Sony BMG)
1998: Melrose Place Soundtrack, She Is Gentle Rain (Sony BMG)
1999: A Voice In The Forest, Colour Naturelle (Natural Color) (Sony BMG)

As collaborator
1971: Intensity - John Klemmer
1972: Head On - Bobby Hutcherson
1972: Iapetus - Hadley Caliman
1974: Love, Love - Julian Priester
1975: Rebirth Cycle - James Mtume 
1976: Automatic Man - Automatic Man
1976: You to Me Are Everything - The Real Thing
1977: Visitors - Automatic Man
1977: Spellbound - Alphonso Johnson
1978: Peter Gabriel - Peter Gabriel
1979: Slug Line - John Hiatt
1979: I Wanna Play for You - Stanley Clarke
1979: Betcha - Stanley Turrentine
1979: Touching You, Touching Me - Airto Moreira
1980: 1:PM  - PM
1980: Aretha - Aretha Franklin
1980: Fuse One - Fuse One 
1981: America's Greatest Hero - Joey Scarbury
1982: H.A.T.E. Don't Live Here Anymore - Staple Singers
1982: Hollywood - Maynard Ferguson
1983: Home Again - Stanley Turrentine
1984: Sunrise - Paulinho Da Costa
1985: Put Sunshine In It – Arthur Blythe 
1986: Headed For The Future - Neil Diamond
1987: Strawberry Moon - Grover Washington Jr. 
1988: Out of Control - Dynasty
1989: Through The Moving Window - Juan Martin
1989: Times Are Changing - Freddie Hubbard
1991: Animal Logic II - Animal Logic
1993: Now and Then - Ernestine Anderson
1995: What´s Inside - Joan Armatrading
2000: The Friends - Fishbone 
2004: Trios: East River Drive/Schooldays/Live at the Greek - Stanley Clarke
2005: Blue Note Plays Sting - Freddie Hubbard
2005: Robbery - Teena Marie
2005: Very Best of George Howard - George Howard
2007: Moodo Records Presents Guitarra de Pasion, Vol. 3 - Juan Carlos Quintero 
2008: Believe It or Not: The Billy Griffin Collection - Billy Griffin

References

Additional References 
Peter Gabriel by Armando Gallo p. 21, © Omnibus Press 1986

The Universal Tone - Bringing My Story to Light by Carlos Santana with Ashley Kahn and Hal Miller p. 356 Little, Brown and Company © 2014

Listen Whitey - The Sights and Sounds of Black Power 1965 - 1975 by Pat Thomas p. 102 Fantagraphics Books © 2012

Meeting Vibraphone Jazz 'Head On' by Kevin Whitehead Fresh Air NPR September 9, 2008

Todd Cochran on the Oberheim Four Voice by Bob Moog, Keyboard Magazine, p. 117 December 1989 

Between Sound and Space: ECM Records and Beyond Julian Priester: Love Love by Tyran Grillo July 2012

100 Greatest Jazz Albums, Bobby Hutcherson - Head On Blue Note Re-release (with added tracks): May 13th 2008

But Not Forgotten – Music by African-American composers for Clarinet & Piano, Marcus Eley (clarinet) "Soul-Bird" composed by Todd Cochran CD Review: MusicWeb-International (UK) 

Apples, Oranges, and Arthur Blythe from In The Moment by Francis Davis p. 188 Oxford University Press, 1986

A Perfect Sense of Ensemble Cue Newspaper National Arts Festival  Marcus Eley, Soul-Bird Grahamtown South Africa, Monday, July 6, 2009

Omnivore Spotlights Worlds Around The Sun Re-issue The Second Disc theseconddisc.com January 15, 2014

Bayeté Todd Cochran Worlds Around The Sun Review by Brian Greene It's Psychedelic Baby! Magazine, January 29, 2014

Bayeté Todd Cochran Worlds Around The Sun Review by Steve Maxwell Von Braund, The Boomerang Wire www.thewire.co.uk March 2014

Creative Music and other forms of Avant Garde- Jazz Weekly March 17, 2014

Jazz Greats Jaco Pastorius And Bayeté Revisit Their Best Albums JP'S Music Blog Record-Journal April 1, 2014

JazzWax by Marc Myers Marc Myerswrites daily on jazz legends and legendary jazz recordings Bayeté—Worlds Around the Sun (Omnivore) April 11, 2014

JFS #177 The Bayete Todd Cochran Interview | Jake Feinberg Show June 8, 2014

Cash Box by David Bowling Worlds Around The Sun by Bayeté Todd Cochran Sunday May 25, 2014

Black Power Jazz Revisited London Evening Standard U.K. by Alastair McKay Uncut Magazine Worlds Around The Sun by Bayeté Todd Cochran July 2014

The Spy Movie That Upset the American Dream (The Spook Who Sat Behind The Door) by J. Hoberman The New York Times September 18, 2020

The Spook Who Sat Behind The Door - 2012 National Film Registry 

Clarinet Works by Black Composers The Clarinet International Clarinet Association, December 2020

External links
Todd Cochran Website
Extensive biography and discography

1951 births
Living people
American jazz pianists
American male pianists
Soul-jazz organists
Hard bop organists
Jazz-funk organists
American jazz organists
American male organists
Prestige Records artists
20th-century American pianists
21st-century American pianists
21st-century organists
20th-century American male musicians
21st-century American male musicians
American male jazz musicians
21st-century American keyboardists
Automatic Man members